Best Leftovers Ever! is a 2020 streaming television series. The premise revolves around a cooking competition where the goal is to use leftovers and turn them into something great. It was released on December 30, 2020 on Netflix.

Cast 
 Jackie Tohn
 David So
 Rosemary Shrager
 Shawn Niles
 Nate Wood
 Malikah Shavonne 
 Jim Purvis

References

External links
 
 

2020 American television series debuts
English-language Netflix original programming
2020s American reality television series
Food reality television series